Dmitri Mikhailovich Alperovitch (born 1980) is a Russian American think-tank founder, investor, philanthropist, podcast host and former computer security industry executive. He is the chairman of Silverado Policy Accelerator, a geopolitics think-tank in Washington, D.C. and a co-founder and former chief technology officer of CrowdStrike. Alperovitch is a naturalized U.S. citizen born in Russia who came to the United States in 1994 with his family.

Early life and education
Born in Moscow in the Russian SFSR, a constituent republic of the Soviet Union, Alperovitch is a U.S. citizen. In 1994, his father was granted a visa to Canada, and a year later the family moved to Chattanooga, Tennessee. Alperovitch earned a BS in computer science in 2001, and a MS in information security in 2003, both from Georgia Institute of Technology. It was the school's first graduate degree in information security.

Career
Alperovitch worked at a number of computer security startups in the late 1990s and early 2000s, including e-mail security startup CipherTrust, where he was one of the leading inventors of the TrustedSource reputation system. Upon acquisition of CipherTrust by Secure Computing in 2006, he led the research team and launched the Software-as-a-Service business for the company. Alperovitch took over as vice president of threat research at McAfee, when the company acquired Secure Computing in 2008.

In January 2010, he led the investigation into Operation Aurora, the Chinese intrusions into Google and two dozen other companies. Subsequently, he led the investigation of Night Dragon espionage operation of the Western multinational oil and gas companies, and traced them to Song Zhiyue, a Chinese national living in Heze City, Shandong.

In August 2011, he published Operation Shady RAT, a report on suspected Chinese intrusions into at least 72 organizations, including defense contractors, businesses worldwide, the United Nations and the International Olympic Committee.

CrowdStrike
In late 2011, along with entrepreneur George Kurtz and Gregg Marston, Dmitri Alperovitch co-founded and became the chief technology officer of CrowdStrike, a security technology company focused on helping enterprises and governments protect their intellectual property and secrets against cyberespionage and cybercrime.

In 2015, CapitalG (formerly Google Capital), led a $100 million capital drive for CrowdStrike. The firm brought on board senior FBI executives, such as Shawn Henry, former executive assistant director (EAD) of the FBI's Criminal, Cyber, Response and Services Branch, and Steve Chabinsky, former deputy assistant director of the FBI's Cyber Division. By May 2017, CrowdStrike had received $256 million in funding from Warburg Pincus, Accel Partners, and Google Capital and its stock was valued at just under $1 billion.

In June 2019, the company made an initial public offering (IPO) on the NASDAQ, which valued the company at over $10 billion.

Silverado Policy Accelerator
In February 2020, Alperovitch left CrowdStrike to launch the Silverado Policy Accelerator, a nonprofit focused on solving policy challenges connected to great power competition between the U.S. and its adversaries. The organization focuses in particular on policy issues related to cybersecurity, international trade and industrial security, and economic and environmental security. Silverado Policy Accelerator launched in March 2021 with Alperovitch as its executive chairman.

In December 2021, Alperovitch correctly predicted the 2022 Russian invasion of Ukraine, which began in February 2022.

On November 11, 2022, he was personally sanctioned by Ministry of Foreign Affairs (Russia) and banned from entry to Russia, along with David Petraeus, James Stavridis and Ian Bremmer.

U.S. Government
Alperovitch is an inaugural member of the Cyber Safety Review Board, an independent U.S. government board setup by Presidential Executive Order in 2021 with responsibility for cybersecurity incident investigations.

In March 2022, he was appointed a member of Homeland Security Advisory Council.

Alperovitch has also served as a Special Advisor to the Department of Defense.

Board Memberships
Alperovitch is the chairman of the board of directors of Automox, a cloud-based IT operations company and a board member of Dragos, a company that provides cybersecurity solutions for industrial controls systems.

Philanthropy
In October 2021, Alperovitch announced the launch of the Alperovitch Institute for Cybersecurity Studies to be based at the Johns Hopkins University's Paul H. Nitze School of Advanced International Studies. The institute will offer Master of Arts and doctor of philosophy degrees in cybersecurity studies and policy, and an Executive Education program for private sector and government leaders.

Podcasting
Following Russian invasion of Ukraine, Alperovitch became the host of Geopolitics Decanted podcast, where he discusses current geopolitical events with militarily experts, historians, economists and political scientists.

Awards
Alperovitch was awarded the prestigious Federal 100 Award for his contributions to the U.S. federal information security and was recognized in 2013 and 2015 as one of Washingtonian's Tech Titans for his accomplishments in the field of cybersecurity.

In August 2013, he was selected as one of MIT Technology Review'''s Top 35 Innovators Under 35, an award previously won by Larry Page, Sergey Brin, and Mark Zuckerberg.

In 2016, Politico Magazine featured him as one of "Politico 50" influential thinkers, doers, and visionaries transforming U.S. politics.

In 2017, Fortune magazine listed Alperovitch in "40 Under 40" annual ranking of the most influential young people in business, along with Emmanuel Macron, Mark Zuckerberg, and Serena Williams.

He was named in December 2013 as one of Foreign Policy'''s Top 100 Leading Global Thinkers, along with Angela Merkel, John Kerry, Ben Bernanke, and Jeff Bezos.

References

External links

Living people
Chief technology officers of computer security companies
American technology company founders
American chief technology officers
American computer businesspeople
American nonprofit chief executives
American podcasters
Anti-spam
Georgia Tech alumni
Businesspeople from Washington, D.C.
1980 births
Russian emigrants to the United States
McAfee